Tracy Glacier is a channel glacier flowing to the Shackleton Ice Shelf 4 nautical miles (7 km) southwest of Cape Elliott. Delineated from aerial photographs taken by U.S. Navy Operation Highjump, 1946–47. Named by Advisory Committee on Antarctic Names (US-ACAN) for Lieutenant Lloyd W. Tracy, U.S. Navy, pilot with U.S. Navy Operation Windmill, 1947–48, who assisted in operations which resulted in the establishment of astronomical control stations from Wilhelm II Coast to Budd Coast.

See also
 List of glaciers in the Antarctic
 Glaciology

Glaciers of Wilkes Land